Antonio Matarazzo (born April 29, 1993) is an American soccer midfielder.

A native of Fair Lawn, New Jersey, Matarazzo graduated from Fair Lawn High School.

Career

College
Matarazzo played four years of college soccer at Columbia University between 2012 and 2015.

Matarazzo appeared for Premier Development League side New York Red Bulls U-23 in 2015.

Professional
On January 19, 2016, Matarazzo was selected in the second round (48th overall) of the 2016 MLS SuperDraft by Orlando City SC. He signed with United Soccer League's Orlando City B on March 11, 2016.

Matarazzo was released by Orlando City B at the end of the 2016 season.

Matarazzo currently works in the front office of City Football Group.

References

External links
Columbia bio

1993 births
Living people
American soccer players
Columbia Lions men's soccer players
New York Red Bulls U-23 players
Orlando City B players
New York Cosmos B players
Association football midfielders
Soccer players from New Jersey
Orlando City SC draft picks
USL League Two players
National Premier Soccer League players
USL Championship players
Fair Lawn High School alumni
People from Fair Lawn, New Jersey
Sportspeople from Bergen County, New Jersey